The 2014–15 Dallas Stars season was the 48th season for the National Hockey League franchise that was established on June 5, 1967, and 22nd season since the franchise relocated from Minnesota prior to the start of the 1993–94 NHL season. Despite having 92 points, the Stars failed to qualify for the playoffs; even though they qualified the previous year.

Standings

Suspensions/fines

Schedule and results

Pre-season

Regular season

Player statistics
Final 
Skaters

Goaltenders

†Denotes player spent time with another team before joining the Stars.  Stats reflect time with the Stars only.
‡Traded mid-season
Bold/italics denotes franchise record

Notable achievements

Awards

Milestones

Transactions 
The Stars have been involved in the following transactions during the 2014–15 season:

Trades

Free agents acquired

Free agents lost

Claimed via waivers

Lost via waivers

Player signings

Draft picks

The 2014 NHL Entry Draft will be held on June 27–28, 2014, at the Wells Fargo Center in Philadelphia, Pennsylvania.

Draft notes
The Anaheim Ducks' fourth-round pick went to the Dallas Stars as the result of a trade on March 4, 2014, that sent Stephane Robidas to Anaheim in exchange for this pick (being conditional at the time of the trade). The condition – Dallas will receive a third-round pick in 2014 if Anaheim advances to the 2014 Western Conference Final and Robidas plays in at least 50% of Anaheim's playoff games. If both conditions are not converted then this will remain a fourth-round pick. – was converted on April 21, 2014, when Robidas was injured for the remainder of the 2014 Stanley Cup playoffs.
The Calgary Flames' sixth-round pick went to the Dallas Stars as the result of a trade on November 22, 2013, that sent Lane MacDermid to Calgary in exchange for this pick.

References

Dallas Stars seasons
Dallas
Dallas
Dallas Stars
Dallas Stars
2010s in Dallas
2014 in Texas
2015 in Texas